Solofa Uota OBE is a Tuvaluan politician and diplomat who has served in various functions in his country's government.

He has been Permanent Secretary of Education, and, more recently, Secretary to Government.

He had previously served as a diplomat, and was Acting High Commissioner to Fiji.

From 2001 to 2002, he was Secretary of the Tuvalu Trust Fund Directory.

In 2009, he was made Officer of the Order of the British Empire by the Queen of Tuvalu, Elizabeth II, for "public service and service to the community".

References

Living people
Tuvaluan politicians
Officers of the Order of the British Empire
High Commissioners of Tuvalu to Fiji
Year of birth missing (living people)